Anjunabeats Volume 13 is the thirteenth installment in the Anjunabeats Volume compilation series mixed and compiled by British trance group Above & Beyond. It was released on 10 February 2017 through Anjunabeats.

Track listing

Release history

References

External links 
 Anjunabeats Volume 13 holding page

2017 compilation albums
Above & Beyond (band) albums
Anjunabeats compilation albums
Sequel albums
Electronic compilation albums